Bogue Flower may refer to:

Bogue Flower (Eucutta Creek tributary), a stream in Mississippi
Bogue Flower (Tallahatta Creek tributary), a stream in Mississippi